Gleneagles Kota Kinabalu Hospital is a private hospital in the city of Kota Kinabalu, Sabah, Malaysia. The hospital offers medical services including cardiac care, brain and nerve, orthopaedic and spine, endocrinology, oncology, women and children care.

History 
Opened on 5 May 2015, it is the first international tertiary hospital in the city.   Gleneagles Kota Kinabalu has a total capacity of 200 inpatient beds, 80 Medical Suites, 6 Operating Theatres, 15 Intensive Care Units, 7 Neonatal Intensive Care Units and 6 Labour & Delivery Suites. A branch of Pantai Medical Centre Sdn Bhd under Parkway Pantai Limited, Gleneagles Kota Kinabalu is assimilated with regionally well-established premium Gleneagles brand.

See also 
 List of hospitals in Malaysia

References 

Buildings and structures in Kota Kinabalu
Hospital buildings completed in 2015
Hospitals in Sabah